Sodom and Gomorrah were two legendary biblical cities destroyed by God for their wickedness. Their story parallels the Genesis flood narrative in its theme of God's anger provoked by man's sin (see Genesis 19:1–28). They are mentioned frequently in the prophets and the New Testament as symbols of human wickedness and divine retribution, and the Quran also contains a version of the story about the two cities. The narrative of their destruction may have a relation to the remains of third-millennium Bronze Age cities in the region, and subsequent Late Bronze Age collapse.

Etymology
The etymology of the names Sodom and Gomorrah is uncertain, and scholars disagree about them. According to Burton MacDonald, the Hebrew term for Gomorrah was based on the Semitic root , which means "be deep", "copious (water)".

Biblical narrative

Sodom and Gomorrah are two of the five "cities of the plain" referred in Genesis 13:12 and Genesis 19:29 subject to Chedorlaomer of Elam, which rebel against him. At the Battle of Siddim, Chedorlaomer defeats them and takes many captives, including Lot, the nephew of the Hebrew patriarch Abraham. Abraham gathers his men, rescues Lot, and frees the cities.

Later, God gives advance notice to Abraham that Sodom had a reputation for wickedness. Abraham asks God "Will you sweep away the righteous with the wicked?" (Genesis 18:23). Starting at 50 people, Abraham negotiates with God to spare Sodom if 10 righteous people could be found.

God sends two angels to destroy Sodom. Lot welcomes them into his home, but all the men of the town surround the house and demand that he surrender the visitors that they may "know" them. Lot offers the mob his virgin daughters to "do to them as you please", but they refuse and threaten to do worse to Lot. The angels strike the crowd blind.

The angels tell Lot "...the outcry against its people has become great before the Lord, and the Lord has sent us to destroy it" (Genesis 19:13). The next morning, because Lot had lingered, the angels take Lot, Lot's wife, and his two daughters by the hand and out of the city, and tell him to flee to the hills and not look back. Lot says that the hills are too far away and asks to go to Zoar instead. Then God rains sulfur and fire on Sodom and Gomorrah and all the Plain, and all the inhabitants of the cities, and what grew on the ground (Genesis 19:24–25). Lot and his two daughters are saved, but his wife disregards the angels' warning, looks back, and is turned into a pillar of salt.

Other biblical references
The Hebrew Bible contains several other references to Sodom and Gomorrah. The New Testament also contains passages of parallels to the destruction and surrounding events that pertained to these cities and those who were involved. Later deuterocanonical texts attempt to glean additional insights about these cities of the Jordan Plain and their residents. Additionally, the sins which triggered the destruction are reminiscent of the Book of Judges' account of the Levite's concubine.

Hebrew Bible
"Sodom and Gomorrah" becomes a byword for destruction and desolation. Deuteronomy 29:21–23 refers to the destruction of Sodom and Gomorrah:

Isaiah 1:9–10, 3:9 and 13:19–22 address people as from Sodom and Gomorrah, associates Sodom with shameless sinning and tells Babylon that it will end like those two cities.

Jeremiah 23:14, 49:17–18, 50:39–40 and Lamentations 4:6 associate Sodom and Gomorrah with adultery and lies, prophesy the fate of Edom (south of the Dead Sea), predict the fate of Babylon and use Sodom as a comparison.

Ezekiel 16:48–50 compares Jerusalem to Sodom, saying "As I live, saith the Lord , Sodom thy sister hath not done, she nor her daughters, as thou hast done, thou and thy daughters. Behold, this was the iniquity of thy sister Sodom: pride, fulness of bread, and careless ease was in her and in her daughters; neither did she strengthen the hand of the poor and needy. And they were haughty, and committed abomination before Me; therefore I removed them when I saw it." He explains that the sin of Sodom was that "thy sister, Sodom, pride, fulness of bread, and abundance of idleness was in her and in her daughters, neither did she strengthen the hand of the poor and needy. And they were haughty, and committed abomination before me: therefore I took them away as I saw good."

In Amos 4:1–11, God tells the Israelites that although he treated them like Sodom and Gomorrah, they still did not repent.

In Zephaniah 2:9, Zephaniah tells Moab and Ammon that they will end up like Sodom and Gomorrah.

Deuterocanon

Wisdom 10:6–8 refers to the Five Cities:

Wisdom 19:17 says that the Egyptians who enslaved the Israelites were "struck with blindness, like the men of Sodom who came to the door of that righteous man Lot. They found themselves in total darkness, as each one groped around to find his own door."

Sirach 16:8 says "[God] did not spare the neighbors of Lot, whom he loathed on account of their insolence."

In 3 Maccabees 2:5, the high priest Simon says that God "consumed with fire and sulfur the men of Sodom who acted arrogantly, who were notorious for their vices; and you made them an example to those who should come afterward".

2 Esdras 2:8–9 says "Woe to you, Assyria, who conceal the unrighteous in your midst! O wicked nation, remember what I did to Sodom and Gomor′rah, whose land lies in lumps of pitch and heaps of ashes. So will I do to those who have not listened to me, says the Lord Almighty."

2 Esdras 5:1–13 describes signs of the end times, one of which is that "the sea of Sodom shall cast up fish".

In 2 Esdras 7:106, Ezra says that Abraham prayed for the people of Sodom.

Chapter 12 of 1 Meqabyan, a book considered canonical in the Ethiopian Orthodox Tewahedo Church, references "Gemorra an Sedom".

New Testament
In Matthew 10:14–15 (cf. Luke 10:11–12) Jesus says:

In Matthew 11:20–24, Jesus warns of the fate of some cities where he did some of his works:

In Luke 17:28–30, Jesus says: 

Romans 9:29 references Isaiah 1:9: "And as Isaiah predicted, "If the Lord of hosts had not left survivors to us, we would have fared like Sodom and been made like Gomorrah."

2 Peter 2:4–10 says that just as God destroyed Sodom and Gomorrah and saved Lot, he will deliver godly people from temptations and punish the wicked on Judgement Day.

Jude 1:7 records that both Sodom and Gomorrah "indulged in sexual immorality and pursued unnatural lust, serve as an example by undergoing a punishment of eternal fire."

Revelation 11:7–8, regarding the two witnesses, reads:

The sin of Sodom

Sodom and Gomorrah, or the "cities of the plain", have been used historically and in modern discourse as metaphors for homosexuality, and are the origin of the English words sodomite, a pejorative term for male homosexuals, and sodomy, which is used in a legal context under the label "crimes against nature" to describe anal or oral sex (particularly homosexual) and bestiality. This is based upon exegesis of the biblical text interpreting divine judgment upon Sodom and Gomorrah as punishment for the sin of homosexual sex. A number of contemporary scholars dispute this interpretation in light of Ezekiel 16:49–50 ("This was the guilt of your sister Sodom: she and her daughters had pride, excess of food, and prosperous ease, but did not aid the poor and needy. They were haughty, and did abominable things before me; therefore I removed them when I saw it."), interpreting the sin as arrogance and the lack of hospitality. The traditional view also uses the same verse claiming the term "abominable" here as a reference to Leviticus 18:22 which refers to homosexuality as an "abomination" before God. Some Islamic societies incorporate punishments associated with Sodom and Gomorrah into sharia.

Historicity
It has been suggested that if the story does have a historical basis, the cities may have been destroyed by a natural disaster. One such idea is that the Dead Sea was devastated by an earthquake between 2100 and 1900 BCE. This might have unleashed showers of steaming tar. It is possible that the towns were destroyed by an earthquake, especially as they lay along a major fault such as the Jordan Rift Valley; however, there are no known contemporary accounts of seismic activity that corroborate this theory and this and the suggestion that they were destroyed by a volcano have been deemed unlikely.

Possible sites
Archibald Sayce translated an Akkadian poem describing cities that were destroyed in a rain of fire, written from the view of a person who escaped the destruction but the names of the cities are not given. Sayce later mentions that the story more closely resembles the doom of Sennacherib's host.

The ancient Greek historiographer Strabo states that locals living near Moasada (as opposed to Masada) say that "there were once thirteen inhabited cities in that region of which Sodom was the metropolis".

The Jewish historian Josephus identifies the Dead Sea in geographic proximity to the ancient biblical city of Sodom. He refers to the lake by its Greek name, Asphaltites.

In 1973, Walter E. Rast and R. Thomas Schaub discovered or visited a number of possible sites of the cities, including Bab edh-Dhra, which was originally excavated in 1965 by archaeologist Paul Lapp, and later finished by Rast and Schaub following Lapp's death. Other possibilities include Numeira, al-Safi, Feifa (or Fifa, Feifah), and Khirbet al-Khanazir, which were also visited by Schaub and Rast. According to Schaub, Numeira was destroyed in 2600 BCE at a different time period than Bab edh-Dhra (2350–2067 BCE).

In 1993 Nancy Lapp, from the Pittsburgh Theological Seminary, reported that Feifa had no Bronze Age occupation and merely an Early Bronze Age cemetery with Iron Age walls. She reports:
 At Khirbet al-Khanazir, the walls which Rast and Schaub had identified in 1973 as houses were in reality rectangular charnel houses marking EB IV shaft tombs and not occupational structures.

In 1976, Giovanni Pettinato claimed that a cuneiform tablet that had been found in the newly discovered library at Ebla contained the names of all five of the cities of the plain (Sodom, Gomorrah, Admah, Zeboim, and Bela), listed in the same order as in Genesis. The names si-da-mu [TM.76.G.524] and ì-ma-ar [TM.75.G.1570 and TM.75.G.2233] were identified as representing Sodom and Gomorrah, which gained some acceptance at the time. However, Alfonso Archi states that, judging from the surrounding city names in the cuneiform list, si-da-mu lies in northern Syria and not near the Dead Sea, and ì-ma-ar is a variant of ì-mar, known to represent Emar, an ancient city located near Ebla. Today, the scholarly consensus is that "Ebla has no bearing on ... Sodom and Gomorra."

Religious views

Judaism
Later Hebrew prophets named the sins of Sodom and Gomorrah as adultery, pridefulness, and uncharitableness.

Rictor Norton views classical Jewish texts as stressing the cruelty and lack of hospitality of the inhabitants of Sodom to the "stranger". Rabbinic writings affirm that the Sodomites also committed economic crimes, blasphemy, and bloodshed. Other extrabiblical crimes committed by Sodom and Gomorrah included extortion on crossing a bridge/or swimming a river, harshly punishing victims for crimes that the perpetrator committed, forcing an assault victim to pay for the perpetrator's "bleeding" and forcing a woman to marry a man who intentionally caused her miscarriage to compensate for the lost child. Because of this, the judges of the two cities were referred to as Shakrai ("Liar"), Shakurai ("Awful Liar"), Zayyafi ("Forger") and Mazle Dina ("Perverter of Justice"). Eliezer was reported to be a victim of such legally unjust conduct, after Sarah sent him to Sodom to report on Lot's welfare. The citizens also regularly tortured foreigners who sought lodging. They did this by providing the foreigners a standard-sized bed and if they saw that the foreigners were too short for the beds, they would forcibly stretch their limbs but if the foreigners were too tall, they would cut off their legs (the Greek myth of Procrustes tells a similar story). As a result, many people refrained from visiting Sodom and Gomorrah.  Beggars who settled into the two cities for refuge were similarly mistreated. The citizens would give them marked coins (presumably used to purchase food) but were nonetheless forbidden, by proclamation, to provide these necessary services. Once the beggar died of starvation, citizens who initially gave the beggar the coins were permitted to retrieve them, provided that they could recognize it. The beggar's clothing was also provided as a reward for any citizen who could successfully overcome his opponent in a street fight.

The provision of bread and water to the poor was also a capital offense (Yalḳ., Gen. 83). Two girls, one poor and the other rich, went to a well, and the former gave the latter her jug of water, receiving in return a vessel containing bread. When this became known, both were burned alive (ib.). According to the Book of Jasher, Paltith, one of Lot's daughters, was burnt alive (in some versions, on a pyre) for giving a poor man bread. Her cries went to the heavens. Another woman was similarly executed in Admah for giving a traveler, who intended to leave the town the next day, water. When the scandal was revealed, the woman was stripped naked and covered with honey. This attracted bees as the woman was slowly stung to death. Her cries then went up into the heavens, the turning point that was revealed to have provoked God to enact judgement upon Sodom and Gomorrah in the first place in Genesis 18:20. Lot's wife (who came from Sodom) had disapproved of her husband welcoming the strangers into their home; her asking for salt from neighbors had alerted the mob which came to Lot's door. As punishment she was turned into a pillar of salt.

Jon D. Levenson views a rabbinic tradition described in the Mishnah as postulating that the sin of Sodom was a violation of conventional hospitality in addition to homosexual conduct, describing Sodom's lack of generosity with the saying, "What is mine is mine; what is yours is yours" (m. Avot 5.10).

Jay Michaelson proposes a reading of the story of Sodom that emphasizes the violation of hospitality as well as the violence of the Sodomites. "Homosexual rape is the way in which they violate hospitality—not the essence of their transgression. Reading the story of Sodom as being about homosexuality is like reading the story of an ax murderer as being about an ax." Michaelson places the story of Sodom in context with other Genesis stories regarding Abraham's hospitality to strangers, and argues that when other texts in the Hebrew Bible mention Sodom, they do so without commentary on homosexuality. The verses cited by Michaelson include Jeremiah 23:14, where the sins of Jerusalem are compared to Sodom and are listed as adultery, lying, and strengthening the hands of evildoers; Amos 4:1–11 (oppressing the poor and crushing the needy); and Ezekiel 16:49–50, which defines the sins of Sodom as "pride, fullness of bread, and abundance of idleness was in her and in her daughters, neither did she strengthen the hand of the poor and needy. And they were haughty, and did toevah before me, and I took them away as I saw fit." Michaelson uses toevah in place of abomination to emphasize the original Hebrew, which he explains as being more correctly translated as "taboo".

Rabbi Basil Herring, who served as head of the Rabbinical Council of America from 2003 to 2012, writes that both the rabbinic literature and modern Orthodox position consider the Torah to condemn homosexuality as an abomination. Moreover, that it "conveys its abhorrence of homosexuality through a variety of narrative settings", God's judgment of Sodom and Gomorrah being a "paradigmatic" instance of such condemnation.

Christianity
Two areas of contention have arisen in modern Christian scholarship concerning the story of Sodom and Gomorrah:

 Whether or not the violent mob surrounding Lot's house were demanding to engage in sexual violence against Lot's guests.
 Whether it was homosexuality or another transgression, such as the act of inhospitable behavior towards visitors, the act of sexual assault, murder, theft, adultery, idolatry, power abuses, or prideful and mocking behavior, that was the principal reason for God's destruction of Sodom and Gomorrah.

The first contention focuses primarily upon the meaning of the Hebrew verb  (yada), translated as know in the King James Version:

Yada is used to refer to sexual intercourse in various instances, such as in Genesis 4:1 between Adam and Eve:

Some Hebrew scholars believe that yada, unlike the English word "know", requires the existence of a "personal and intimate relationship". For this reason, many of the most popular of the 20th century translations, including the New International Version, the New King James Version, and the New Living Translation, translate yada as "have sex with" or "know ... carnally" in Genesis 9:5.

Those who favor the non-sexual interpretation argue against a denotation of sexual behavior in this context, noting that while the Hebrew word for "know" appears over 900 times in the Hebrew Bible, only 1% (13–14 times) of those references are clearly used as a euphemism for realizing sexual intimacy. Instead, those who hold to this interpretation see the demand to know as demanding the right to interrogate the strangers.

Countering this is the observation that one of the examples of "know" meaning to know sexually occurs when Lot responds to the Genesis 19:5 request, by offering his daughters for rape, only three verses later in the same narrative:

The Epistle of Jude is a major text in regard to these conflicting opinions:

Many who interpret the stories in a non-sexual context contend that as the word for "strange" is akin to "another", "other", "altered" or even "next", the meaning is unclear, and if the condemnation of Sodom was the result of sexual activities perceived to be perverse, then it is likely that it was because women sought to commit fornication with "other than human" angels, perhaps referring to Genesis 6:1–4 or the apocryphal Book of Enoch. Countering this, it is pointed out that Genesis 6 refers to angels seeking women, not men seeking angels, and that both Sodom and Gomorrah were engaged in the sin Jude describes before the angelic visitation, and that, regardless, it is doubtful that the Sodomites knew they were angels. In addition, it is argued the word used in the King James Version of the Bible for "strange", can mean unlawful or corrupted (eg. in Romans 7:3, Galatians 1:6), and that the apocryphal Second Book of Enoch condemns "sodomitic" sex (2 Enoch 10:3; 34:1), thus indicating that homosexual relations was the prevalent physical sin of Sodom.

Both the non-sexual and the homosexuality view invoke certain classical writings as well as other portions of the Bible.

Here the nonsexual view focuses on the inhospitality aspect, while the other notes the description detestable or abomination, the Hebrew word for which often denotes moral sins, including those of a sexual nature.

The nonsexual view focuses on the cultural importance of hospitality, which this biblical story shares with other ancient civilizations, such as Ancient Greece and Ancient Rome, where hospitality was of singular importance and strangers were under the protection of the gods. James L. Kugel, Starr Professor of Hebrew Literature at Harvard University suggests the story encompasses the sexual and non-sexual: the Sodomites were guilty of stinginess, inhospitality and sexual license, homo- and heterosexual in contrast to the generosity of Abraham, and Lot whose behavior in protecting the visitors but offering his daughters suggests he was "scarcely better than his neighbors" according to some ancient commentators, The Bible As It Was, 1997, pp. 179–197.

Within the Christian churches that agree on the possible sexual interpretation of "know" (yada) in this context, there is still a difference of opinion on whether homosexuality is important. On its website, the Anglican Communion presents the argument that the story is "not even vaguely about homosexual love or relationships", but is instead "about dominance and rape, by definition an act of violence, not of sex or love". This argument that the violence and the threat of violence towards foreign visitors is the true ethical downfall of Sodom (and not homosexuality), also observes the similarity between the Sodom and Gomorrah and the Battle of Gibeah Bible stories. In both stories, an inhospitable mob demands the homosexual rape of a foreigner or foreigners. As the mob instead settles for the rape and murder of the foreigner's female concubine in the Battle of Gibeah story, the homosexual aspect is generally seen as inconsequential, and the ethical downfall is understood to be the violence and the threat of violence towards foreigners by the mob. This Exodus 22:21–24 lesson is viewed by Anglicans as a more historically accurate way to interpret the Sodom and Gomorrah story.

Scholar in history and gender studies Lisa McClain has claimed that the association between Sodom and Gomorrah with homosexuality emerged from the writings of 1st century Jewish philosopher Philo, and that no prior exegesis of the text suggested such a linkage.

Islam

The Quran contains twelve references to "the people of Lut", the biblical Lot, the residents of Sodom and Gomorrah presumably, and their destruction by God which is associated primarily with their homosexual practices, which the Quran states they were the first creatures to commit such a deed. On the other hand, certain contemporary western scholars assert that the reason for the destruction of Sodom and Gomorrah was a combination of sexual assault, breaking the hospitality law and engaging in robbery.

The "people of Lot" transgressed consciously against the bounds of God. Lot only prayed to God to be saved from doing as they did. Then Gabriel met Lot and said that he must leave the city quickly, as God had given this command to Lot to save his life. In the Quran it was written that Lot's wife stayed behind, as she had transgressed. She met her fate in the disaster, and only Lot and his family were saved during the destruction of their city, with the understanding that the cities of Sodom and Gomorrah are identified in Genesis, but "the location remains unnamed in the Qur'an"

In the Quran, chapter 26 (The Poets) –

Gnosticism
A different idea is found in the Paraphrase of Shem, a Gnostic text from the literature of the Nag Hammadi library. In this narrative, the figure Shem, who is guided by a spiritual savior named Derdekeas, brings his universal teaching of secret knowledge (gnosis) to the citizens of Sodom before the city is unjustly destroyed by the base nature of the demon of human form.

Modern Sodom

The site of the present Dead Sea Works, a large operation for the extraction of Dead Sea minerals, is called "Sdom" (סדום) according to its traditional Arab name, Khirbet as-sudūm (خربت السدوم). Nearby is Mount Sodom (הר סדום in Hebrew and جبل السدوم in Arabic) which consists mainly of salt. In the Plain of Sdom (מישור סדום) to the south there are a few springs and two small agricultural villages, Neot HaKikar and Ein Tamar.

See also
 Bab edh-Dhra and Numeira, two adjacent archeological sites said by some to be the two cities' locations
 Christianity and homosexuality
 Christianity and sexual orientation
 Hospitium
 Homosexuality and Judaism
 Homosexuality and religion
 Homosexuality in the Hebrew Bible
 LGBT in Islam
 Levite's concubine – similar biblical narrative
 Religion and LGBT people
 The Bible and homosexuality
 Tripura, cities likewise destroyed by divine intervention as described in Hindu mythology 
 Vayeira, the Torah portion concerning Sodom and Gomorrah
 Xenia

Notes

References

Citations

Bibliography

External links

 Map of the Dead Sea from a book by Christian van Adrichem, 1590, depicting Sodom and Gomorrah going on flames in the sea, called (in Latin) 'Dead Sea, Salt Lake, Sea of Asphalt', Eran Laor Cartographic Collection, The National Library of Israel

 
Angelic apparitions in the Bible
Bible-related controversies
Biblical phrases
Book of Genesis
Destroyed cities
Gang rape
Gang rape in Asia
Lech-Lecha
LGBT and Christianity
LGBT and Judaism
LGBT and Islam
Sexuality in the Bible
Torah cities
Vayeira